The formation of the 4th Reserve Division of Kunming Military Region() started from March 1983 in Duyun, Guizhou. The division was then composed of:
10th Regiment - Fuquan
11th Regiment - Huishui
12th Regiment - Dushan

The division was redesignated as the Reserve Infantry Division of Duyun() in July 1984. An artillery regiment was activated in the same month. All regiments under the division were redesignated as follow:
1st Regiment - Fuquan
2nd Regiment - Huishui
3rd Regiment - former 12th, at Dushan County
Artillery Regiment - Guiding County

The division was redesignated as the Reserve Infantry Division of Duyun() in late 1985.

The division was likely disbanded in 1998.

References

Reserve divisions of the People's Liberation Army
Military units and formations established in 1983